Luis Miguel Escalada (born 27 February 1986) is an Argentine professional footballer who plays as a forward for S.D. Aucas.

Career
Escalada was born in Ceres. He has previously played for Boca Juniors, Gimnasia de Jujuy and Newell's Old Boys in Argentina, Emelec and LDU Quito in Ecuador, and Botafogo in Brazil.

Escalada signed with Major League Soccer side Real Salt Lake in early 2009 and made his MLS debut on 18 April 2009 as a substitute in a game against the New York Red Bulls. He scored his first goal on 25 April 2009 in a 6–0 win over New England Revolution.

Career statistics

Honors

Club
LDU Quito
Serie A: 2007

Real Salt Lake
MLS: 2009

Emelec
Serie A: 2014

Individual
Emelec
2006 Ecuadorian Serie A: top scorer

References

External links
  
 Statistics at Irish Times
 

1986 births
Living people
People from San Cristóbal Department
Argentine footballers
Association football forwards
Boca Juniors footballers
C.S. Emelec footballers
L.D.U. Quito footballers
Botafogo de Futebol e Regatas players
Gimnasia y Esgrima de Jujuy footballers
Newell's Old Boys footballers
Real Salt Lake players
C.D. Cuenca footballers
Sporting Cristal footballers
Manta F.C. footballers
S.D. Quito footballers
Deportivo Táchira F.C. players
S.D. Aucas footballers
C.D. Universidad Católica del Ecuador footballers
Argentine Primera División players
Ecuadorian Serie A players
Major League Soccer players
Peruvian Primera División players
Argentine expatriate footballers
Argentine expatriate sportspeople in Ecuador
Argentine expatriate sportspeople in Brazil
Argentine expatriate sportspeople in the United States
Argentine expatriate sportspeople in Peru
Argentine expatriate sportspeople in Venezuela
Expatriate footballers in Ecuador
Expatriate footballers in Brazil
Expatriate soccer players in the United States
Expatriate footballers in Peru
Expatriate footballers in Venezuela
Sportspeople from Santa Fe Province